Alia Moses (born January 6, 1962), formerly known as Alia Moses Ludlum, is the Chief United States district judge of the United States District Court for the Western District of Texas.

Early life and education
Born in Eagle Pass, Texas, Moses graduated in 1983 from Texas Woman's University with a Bachelor of Business Administration degree in Accounting, and in 1986 from the University of Texas School of Law with a Juris Doctor.

Legal career
Following law school graduation, Moses was an attorney in the Travis County Attorney's Office in Austin, Texas from 1986 to 1990. She was an assistant United States attorney and chief of the Del Rio office in the Western District of Texas from 1990 to 1997. She worked as a part-time mediator in private practice from 1997 to 2000.

Federal judicial career
Moses began her federal judicial career as a United States magistrate judge when she was appointed to a four-year part-term in 1997. In 2000, she was promoted to a full-term magistrate judge.

On the recommendation of Texas Senators Phil Gramm and Kay Bailey Hutchison, Moses was nominated by President George W. Bush on July 11, 2002, to the United States District Court for the Western District of Texas. Her seat was previously held by Harry Lee Hudspeth, who then went into senior status. Moses was confirmed by the Senate on November 14, 2002, and received her commission the next day. Moses was appointed to the court under the name of Alia Moses Ludlum. Moses became chief judge on November 18, 2022, when her predecessor Orlando Luis Garcia turned 70 years old.

See also
List of Hispanic/Latino American jurists
List of first women lawyers and judges in Texas

References

Sources

1962 births
Living people
Assistant United States Attorneys
Hispanic and Latino American judges
Judges of the United States District Court for the Western District of Texas
People from Eagle Pass, Texas
Texas Woman's University alumni
United States district court judges appointed by George W. Bush
21st-century American judges
United States magistrate judges
University of Texas School of Law alumni
21st-century American women judges